The Cold Corner 2 is the eleventh mixtape by American rapper Lloyd Banks. It was released on November 8, 2011 for free download. The mixtape features confirmed guest appearances from Prodigy, Styles P and ASAP Rocky. It also includes production from Automatik, Doe Pesci, AraabMuzik, G Sparkz, Beat Butcha, The Jerm, Nick Speed, Dot & Pro and DJ Excellence.

Background
The name was inspired from his eight mixtape, The Cold Corner, released on January 1, 2009.

Track listing

References

External links
Download

2011 mixtape albums
2011 compilation albums
Lloyd Banks albums
Albums produced by Beat Butcha
Albums produced by AraabMuzik
Sequel albums